ieDigital is a British software company, providing financial services technology from its headquarters in Kingston upon Thames, near London.

The company's product is called "Interact", a digital platform for banks and building societies.

ieDigital is owned by Parabellum Investments, which was founded by Rami Cassis.

Clients include global banks Lloyds and HSBC and UK-based Dudley Building Society and Darlington Building Society.

History
ieDigital was founded as Intelligent Environments in 1985 providing software for the financial services sector.

It was rebranded as ieDigital in 2018.

Notable achievements
In 2019 ieDigital was a finalist in the Technology awards for its work with Santander Bank.

In 2021 ieDigital launched "Interact Switch", a digital platform to help mortgage companies retain customers, and announced a partnership with outsystems to benefit its financial IT services.

Notable people
Rami Cassis

Rami Cassis is an entrepreneur, investor and the founder and CEO of private-equity firm Parabellum Investments, which owns ieDigital. In 2010, as CEO of multi-channel service provider Parseq, Rami Cassis led the acquisition of ieDigital as part of a reverse takeover, then became the CEO and largest shareholder.

Jerry Young

Jerry Young is the CEO of ieDigital. He has over 25 years of experience in financial services and software, and has previously worked for Fiserv as EMEA banking operations lead, Oracle Corporation where he was responsible for Banking and Insurance, and FICO as Managing Director.

Garry Larner is ieDigital’s commercial director.

References 

Technology companies of the United Kingdom